
Suárez Lake is a lake in the Cercado Province, Beni Department, Bolivia. Its surface area is 6 km² and it is a short distance southwest of Trinidad City.

Lakes of Beni Department